Stillwater River may refer to:

New Zealand
 Stillwater River (New Zealand), on the South Island

United States
 Stillwater River (Maine)
 Stillwater River (Nashua River tributary), Massachusetts
 Stillwater River (Stillwater County, Montana), a tributary of the Yellowstone River
 Stillwater River (Flathead County, Montana), a tributary of the Whitefish River
 Stillwater River (Ohio)
 Stillwater River (Rhode Island)

See also

Stillwater (disambiguation)